Slow wave may refer to:

Oscillations of low frequency
Slow wave potential, a rhythmic electrophysiological event in the gastrointestinal tract
Slow-wave sleep
Slow-wave coupler, a set of coupled microstrip lines

Other
Slow Wave, a comic strip